WGFG (105.3 FM), known on-air as "Cat Country 105.3", is a country music radio station licensed to Branchville, South Carolina, United States.  The station is currently owned by Community Broadcasters, LLC.

Bad Dog is also the home of Bamberg-Ehrhardt High School football and Clemson Tigers football.  Some of the artists that can be found on The Bad Dog are Led Zeppelin, Pink Floyd, Lynyrd Skynyrd, Styx, and lesser-known classic rock artists like the Ozark Mountain Daredevils, Little Feat and Average White Band.  It was Orangeburg's home for John Boy and Billy every weekday morning until the move over to 105.1. Now, Multiple Award winning radio personality and producer Russ T. Fender co-hosts the morning show with Hailey.

History
Prior to the move of Bad Dog to 105.1, the station carried an Adult Contemporary format as Star 105.1.

The "Bad Dog" format moved to 105.1 MHz and began simulcasting with its former exclusive home at 95.7 on January 14, 2009, as the 95.7 frequency WWBD was sold to Apex Broadcasting. The WWBD letters moved to the former WICI in Sumter, which was also called "Bad Dog".

In 2009, WGFG moved to 105.3 FM.

On July 1, 2011 WGFG changed their format to country, branded as "Cat Country 105.3".

References

External links

GFG
Country radio stations in the United States